4754 Panthoos  is a Jupiter trojan from the Trojan camp, approximately  in diameter. It was discovered during the third Palomar–Leiden Trojan survey on 16 October 1977, by Ingrid and Cornelis van Houten at Leiden, and Tom Gehrels at the Palomar Observatory in California. It is likely spherical in shape and has a longer-than-average rotation period of 27.68 hours. The assumed C-type asteroid is one of the 80 largest Jupiter trojans. It was named after Panthous (Panthoos) from Greek mythology.

Orbit and classification 

Panthoos is a dark Jovian asteroid orbiting in the trailering Trojan camp at Jupiter's  Lagrangian point, 60° behind the Gas Giant's orbit in a 1:1 resonance (see Trojans in astronomy). It is also a non-family asteroid of the Jovian background population.

It orbits the Sun at a distance of 5.2–5.3 AU once every 12 years (4,391 days; semi-major axis of 5.25 AU). Its orbit has an eccentricity of 0.01 and an inclination of 12° with respect to the ecliptic. The body's observation arc begins at Palomar on 11 October 1977, just five nights prior to its official discovery observation.

Palomar–Leiden Trojan survey 

The survey designation "T-3" stands for the third Palomar–Leiden Trojan survey, named after the fruitful collaboration of the Palomar and Leiden Observatory in the 1960s and 1970s. Gehrels used Palomar's Samuel Oschin telescope (also known as the 48-inch Schmidt Telescope), and shipped the photographic plates to Ingrid and Cornelis van Houten at Leiden Observatory where astrometry was carried out. The trio are credited with the discovery of several thousand asteroid discoveries.

Physical characteristics 

Panthoos is an assumed C-type asteroid.

Rotation period 

In February 1994, a rotational lightcurve of Panthoos was obtained from photometric observations over seven consecutive nights by Stefano Mottola and Anders Erikson using the former ESO 1-metre telescope at La Silla Observatory in northern Chile. Lightcurve analysis gave a rotation period of  hours with a brightness variation of 0.09 magnitude. While not being a slow rotator, its period is significantly longer than that of most larger Jupiter trojans (see table below). Moreover, the low brightness amplitude measured by Mottola is indicative of a spherical rather than elongated shape.

Diameter and albedo 

According to the surveys carried out by the Japanese Akari satellite, the Infrared Astronomical Satellite IRAS, and the NEOWISE mission of NASA's Wide-field Infrared Survey Explorer, Panthoos measures between 53.02 and 56.96 kilometers in diameter and its surface has an albedo between 0.051 and 0.063. The Collaborative Asteroid Lightcurve Link derives an albedo of 0.0624 and a diameter of 53.21 kilometers based on an absolute magnitude of 10.0.

Naming 

This minor planet was named from Greek mythology after Panthous (Panthoos), a priest and member of the Trojan senate who warned of the imminent destruction of Troy. The official naming citation was published by the Minor Planet Center on 28 May 1991.

References

External links 
 Asteroid Lightcurve Database (LCDB), query form (info )
 Dictionary of Minor Planet Names, Google books
 Discovery Circumstances: Numbered Minor Planets (1)-(5000) – Minor Planet Center
 Asteroid 4754 Panthoos at the Small Bodies Data Ferret
 
 

004754
Discoveries by Cornelis Johannes van Houten
Discoveries by Ingrid van Houten-Groeneveld
Discoveries by Tom Gehrels
5010
Named minor planets
19771016